The following is a list of notable attractions in Manipur.

Uniqueness 
 Hapta Kangjeibung - World's oldest pologround. 
 Samban-Lei Sekpil .
 Ima Keithel - Asia's largest only-women market.
Polo.
 Khongjom War Memorial Complex.
 Loktak Lake - World's only floating lake. 
 Keibul Lamjao National Park.
 Shirui lily.
 Sangai deer.
Ningthouja dynasty .
 Kangla Fort.
Meitei language 
Manipuri dance
Manipuri pony 
 Andro Fire Place

Forts

 Kangla Fort, on the bank of Imphal River, Manipur is one of the oldest existing forts in the world, with its earliest record of existence dating back to 1445 BC.

 Bihu Loukon, an ancient star shaped mud fort situated in Maklang, Imphal West District, Manipur.

Adventure zones
 Baruni Hill
 Thangjing Hill
 Loktak lake
 Pumlenpat lake 
 Mount Koubru
 Ikop Pat lake 
 Thanga island
 Kaina Hill
 Keibul Lamjao National Park
 Sirohi National Park

Ancient Mythology

The ancient Manipuri mythology is indigenous to Manipur kingdom. It is also related to Manipuri religion (or Sanamahism), which includes thousands of Gods and Goddesses.

Temples 

Sanamahi Kiyong Temple
 Ibudhou Thangjing Temple
Sanamahi Temple
Shree Govindajee Temple
Kaina Temple
Shri Radha Raman Temple, Kanchipur
Ningthoukhong Gopinath Mandir
Sacred Jackfruit Tree
Konthoujam Lairembi gi Khubam
Hiyangthang Lairembi Temple

Mosques 

 Jama Mosque, Imphal

Churches 

 Phungyo Baptist Church
 St. Joseph's Cathedral, Imphal
 Little Flower School Cathedral
 Kuki Baptist Church
 Kuki Christian Church
 Manipur Baptist Church

Historical sites 
 Sacred Jackfruit Tree
 Maibam Lokpa Ching
 Kaina (Manipur) 
 Khongjom War Memorial Complex
Sanamahi Kiyong Temple
Sanamahi Temple
Hiyangthang Lairembi Temple
Bihu Loukon
 Khwairamband Bazar
 INA Martyr's Memorial
 Kangla Palace
 Shree Govindajee Temple
 Ningthoukhong Gopinath Mandir
 Imphal War Cemetery
 Imphal Barracks

National parks 
 Keibul Lamjao National Park
 Sirohi National Park

Wildlife 

 Sangai deer
 Manipuri pony
 Pengba fish
 Manipur bush rat
 Manipur bush quail
 Mrs. Hume's pheasant

Plant life
 Shirui lily is native to the Shirui Hill of Ukhrul district of Manipur. 
 Blue vanda or Kwaklei is a species of Orchid.

 Phoebe hainesiana or Uningthou is a state tree of Manipur, native to the state.

Palaces

 Kangla Palace

Gardens 
 Samban-Lei Sekpil
 Kakching garden
 Kangla garden

Lakes 

 Loktak Lake
 Ikop Pat
 Pumlenpat

Hill stations

Manipur houses a number of Hill stations, in numerous Hill Ranges of the state. Following are a few of them:
 Ukhrul
 Tamenglong
 Chandel
 Sadar Hills
 Churachandpur
Senapati (Tahamzam)
Tengnoupal
Noney
Kamjong
Pherzawl
 Kangpokpi
 Kaina
 Cheirao Ching

Festivals 

Following are a few of  the great festivals celebrated in the state:
 Lai Haraoba
 Yaosang
Imoinu Iratpa
Ningol Chakouba
Sanamahi Ahong Khong Chingba
Mera Hou Chongba
Mera Chaorel Houba
Panthoibi Iratpa
 Cheiraoba
 Heikru Hidongba
Kwaak Taanba
 Sangai festival
 Shirui Lily Festival
 Barak River Festival
Gaan-Ngai

 Maramfest

See also
 Politics of Manipur
 Sports in Manipur
 Art and culture of Manipur
 Art forms of Manipur

References

 
Manipur
Manipur-related lists